Telus Open may refer a number of different golf tournaments in Canada that were sponsored by Telus in the 1990s and 2000s:
Telus Calgary Open, held in Calgary, Alberta
Telus Edmonton Open, held in Edmonton, Alberta
Telus Open, held in Greater Montreal, Quebec
Telus Vancouver Open, held in Vancouver, British Columbia